The 'Tentera Diraja Mosque (Jawi: مسجد تنترا دراج) is a single story old-generation mosque located off Clementi Road in Clementi Woods, Singapore. Located opposite National University of Singapore, the mosque is iconic for its hilltop location and gold painted dome.

History 
Built on the top of Clementi Hill in 1961 by the Muslims who served for the British Army after World War II. It was named Tentera Di-Raja (Malay for Royal Army) in honor of the British Army (Due to the name, the mosque has been erroneously and mistaken by worshippers to be owned by the Malaysian government).

The mosque was officially opened by Yang di-Pertuan Negara, Yusof Ishak on 30 March 1962. Due to the mosque's military roots, a Guard of Honour contingent ceremony made up of Muslim servicemen were present during the opening. In the late 1969 with the British Army's withdrawal from Singapore, the mosque came under the management of the Singapore Government. It was rebuilt to its present state and was officiated by Encik Yusof once more, this time as the President of Singapore.

Today
The administration of the mosque today comes under the purview of Majlis Ugama Islam Singapura.

Unique to the institution, the "Mudik ke Hulu" program provides ex-offenders who have served their sentences a chance to integrate and return to society at no charge or subsidized costs. Regardless of age and gender, the programs include weekly classes and upgrading skills in collaboration with other agencies/organizations.

Transportation
The mosque is accessible from Kent Ridge Bus Terminal and bus services 33, 183 and 188.

See also
 Islam in Singapore
 List of mosques in Singapore

References

1961 establishments in Singapore
Mosques completed in 1961
Tentera Diraja
20th-century architecture in Singapore